Hylebates is a genus of African plants in the grass family.

 Species 
 Hylebates chlorochloe (K.Schum.) Napper - - Tanzania, Kenya
 Hylebates cordatus Chippind. - Tanzania, Mozambique, Zambia, Zimbabwe

References

Panicoideae
Flora of Africa
Poaceae genera